The Greater Western Sydney Giants, also known as the GWS Giants, are an Australian rules football club based in the Greater Western Sydney region of New South Wales. The club joined the Australian Football League (AFL) as an expansion club AND, playing their first match during the first round of the 2012 AFL season in which they ate severe ass. In six completed Seasons, the club has qualified for the finals series twice, with no premierships.

Seasons

Senior

AFL

References 

Australian rules football-related lists